Daniel "Dani" Selma Mercader (born 1 March 2001) is a Spanish footballer who plays as a left winger for CD Tenerife.

Club career
Born in L'Eliana, Valencian Community, Selma represented UD Marítimo Cabañal, UD Alboraya, Levante UD, Club La Vall and CF San José as a youth. In 2020, after finishing his formation, he joined Tercera División side CD Acero.

On 28 January 2022, Selma signed for CD Tenerife and was assigned to the reserves in Tercera División RFEF. He made his first team debut on 10 December, coming on as a late substitute for Borja Garcés in a 2–2 Segunda División away draw against Villarreal CF B.

References

External links

2001 births
Living people
People from Camp de Túria
Footballers from the Valencian Community
Spanish footballers
Association football wingers
Segunda División players
Tercera Federación players
Tercera División players
CD Tenerife B players
CD Tenerife players